Worlds Apart is the third studio album by Australian metalcore band Make Them Suffer. The album was released on 28 July 2017 through Rise Records and was self-produced by the band. This is the last album to feature Tim Madden on drums before his official departure from the band in January 2018.

Background and recording
On 9 June 2017, after Chris Arias-Real, Lachlan Monty, and Louisa Burton left the band, Jaya Jeffery was announced as the new bassist and Booka Nile was announced as the new keyboardist to help complete recording.

Critical reception

The album received positive reviews from critics. Already Heard rated the album 3.5 out of 5 and: "What Make Them Suffer have crafted here is an album that's not afraid to rattle the cage and shake things up a bit. Much like the phoenix must burn out to be born again, the band have moved away from everything they once knew and come out on top. Reinvigorated and more inspired than ever before, this feels like a new beginning. The potential going forward is infinite and that is a very exciting position to be in indeed." Distorted Sound scored the album 8 out of 10 and said: "Simply put, Worlds Apart is not a record for deathcore or death metal fans, necessarily. However, fans of the band and of Ether will not be disappointed, as MAKE THEM SUFFER have crafted a solid and consistent record that certainly represents a move in an exciting direction for the band."

Louder Sound gave the album a positive review and stated: "Granted, Worlds Apart is not the frostbitten maelstrom on which MTS established themselves, but any diehards blanching at this record's euphoric eclecticism will certainly find solace among the intermittent flurries of blastbeats and enamel-peeling screams elsewhere. These guys are suffering for their art successfully." New Noise gave the album 4.5 out of 5 and stated: "With Worlds Apart, Make Them Suffer are clearly on another level." Wall of Sound gave the album a score 7/10 and saying: "It's hard to criticise a band for wanting to move forward in their craft. Worlds Apart is without doubt another stepping stone for MTS moving forward and they have unearthed a gem in the creative talents of Booka Nile. The positives far outweight the negatives for this record and I'm more than interested to see what lies ahead for MTS once they work and tour together with this new line up."

Track listing

Personnel 
Make Them Suffer
 Sean Harmanis – unclean vocals
 Nick McLernon – guitars, backing vocals, engineering
 Jaya Jeffrey – bass
 Tim Madden – drums
 Booka Nile – keyboards, piano, clean vocals

Additional personnel
 Make Them Suffer – production, arrangement
 Fraser Cringle and Tristan Sturmer – engineering
 Matthew Templeman – vocal engineering
 Forrester Savell – mastering, mixing
 Mike Winkelmann – cover art
 Pat Fox – layout

Charts

References 

2017 albums
Make Them Suffer albums